Rear Admiral Kevin John Scarce,  (born 4 May 1952) is a retired Royal Australian Navy officer who was the 34th Governor of South Australia, serving from August 2007 to August 2014. He was succeeded by Hieu Van Le, who had previously been his lieutenant governor. He was Chancellor of the University of Adelaide from 2014 to 2020.

Early life
Born in Adelaide, South Australia on 4 May 1952, Scarce spent his early childhood in Woomera and attended Elizabeth East Primary School and Elizabeth High School.

Career

Military service
Scarce joined the Royal Australian Navy College in 1968 and graduated in 1972, having distinguished himself as an all-round sportsman. In 1973, he continued his training with the Royal Navy in the United Kingdom. On his return to Australia, he served on HMA Ships Vendetta, Yarra and Duchess, at the Sydney shore base  and on the aircraft carrier .

Scarce served during the Vietnam War on the troop transport . After Vietnam, his naval career specialised in military logistics and procurement. He served on the staff of the Australian Embassy's Naval Attaché in Washington, D.C. from 1979 to 1982 and in 1994 returned to Washington to undertake a master's degree in National Security Strategy at the US War College (National Defense University).

In Australia, Scarce rose to the rank of rear admiral and Head of Maritime Systems at the Defence Materiel Organisation.

In 2004 and 2005, Rear Admiral Scarce served as Chief Executive Officer of the South Australian Government Defence Unit. The unit was tasked to expand business opportunities for the State's defence sector. Scarce played a key role in South Australia's winning bid for a A$6 billion defence contract to build three air warfare destroyers for the Australian Defence Force. He was also Chairman of the Defence Industry Advisory Board at the time.

Governor of South Australia
On 3 May 2007, it was announced that Scarce would become Governor of South Australia – the Queen's representative in the state. After his appointment he broke the tenets of viceregal impartiality by publicly stating that he is an avowed supporter of an Australian republic. When appointed, he was the youngest South Australian-born governor and the first Royal Australian Navy officer appointed to the position. In 2008, Scarce was appointed the Patron of Debating SA.

As governor, Scarce stressed the importance of science and maths education, and continued to champion economic opportunities in South Australia's defense sector. In 2010 he told Defense Business SA magazine: 

On 13 February 2012, Scarce's term was extended by two years to 7 August 2014. Hieu Van Le, Scarce's lieutenant-governor, was announced on 26 June 2014 as Scarce's replacement, and took over the role on 1 September.

Also during his incumbency, Scarce presented the deed of title at the Maralinga Tjarutja Section 400 Handback Ceremony at the Maralinga Village. The ceremony marked the return of Section 400 to its traditional owners, which had previously been disallowed access due to radioactive contamination. The contamination was a legacy of a program of British nuclear weapons tests which ran from 1956 until 1963.

Not-for-profit sector
Since ending his term as Governor of South Australia, Scarce has remained active in South Australia's not-for-profit sector. He was appointed Chairman of the Cancer Council of South Australia in November 2014 and has since met many beneficiaries of the organisation's fundraising, research, education and services. He told The Advertiser that he took the role last November after being impressed by the council's work during his time as governor, and also because his grandmother Leah died from cancer. Scarce has also cycled as part of the Cancer Council's Ride for a Reason team in the Santos Tour Down Under. Also in November 2014, Scarce was appointed President of Novita Children's Services which provides assistance to disabled children, their families and carers. Kevin Scarce and Raymond Spencer are ambassadors for Impact 100, a sub fund of the Australian Communities Foundation, which awards grants to not-for-profit organisations in South Australia. In 2016, Scarce joined the board of Operation Flinders.

Chancellor of the University of Adelaide
Scarce was appointed the 16th Chancellor of the University of Adelaide with effect from 1 December 2014 in succession to the Hon Robert Hill AC, who retired in July 2014. In the interim, Deputy Chancellor, Di Davidson, was the Acting Chancellor of the University. Scarce retired from this role on 4 May 2020, with his resignation followed the next day by the Vice-Chancellor, Peter Rathjen, taking an indefinite leave of absence. Scarce was succeeded as Chancellor by Catherine Branson in July of the same year.

Deputy Chairman, Seeley International
Scarce joined the board of directors of Seeley International in December 2014 and was later appointed Deputy Chairman.

Nuclear fuel cycle royal commission
In December 2014, Scarce broke seven years of 'political silence' by suggesting that South Australia consider developing nuclear industries to compensate for a downturn in the manufacturing sector. He said that a debate between experts and without political intervention was needed. He was speaking as an invited guest of the South Australian Chamber of Mines and Energy (SACOME).

On 9 February 2015, the South Australian Premier, Jay Weatherill, announced that Scarce would lead a Nuclear Fuel Cycle Royal Commission to inquire into the possible expansion of nuclear industries in South Australia, including uranium mining, enrichment, power generation and radioactive waste storage. He told the media that he wanted a debate on the opportunities and risks the development of nuclear industries in South Australia represented, stating: "I come to this with no preconceived views."

Scarce appeared in a segment about the nuclear Royal Commission on ABC's 7.30 program, broadcast on 14 March 2015. He said: 

In May 2016, Scarce completed the report and presented to the Government of South Australia and the public. The report provided twelve key recommendations and determined that the greatest economic opportunity for the nuclear industry in South Australia was in the establishment of a deep geological repository for imported spent nuclear fuel.

Following the conclusion of the commission, Scarce gave presentations about the final report and its recommendations at various private and public events, including those hosted by the University of South Australia (in collaboration with UCL Australia), the Committee for Economic Development of Australia (CEDA) and the Resources and Engineering Skills Alliance. In addition to promoting the opportunities that his Commission identified in the nuclear industry, Scarce has also restated his interest in Australia considering becoming a republic.

Honours
 26 January 1994: Conspicuous Service Cross
 11 June 2001: Member of the Order of Australia (Military division) for exceptional service to the Royal Australian Navy as Commander Training Command – Navy, and as Support Commander – Navy.
 26 January 2004: Officer of the Order of Australia (Military division) for distinguished service in logistics management and acquisition as the Head, Maritime Systems Division in the Defence Materiel Organisation.
 9 August 2007: Knight of Grace in the Venerable Order of Saint John, awarded by the Governor-General of Australia.
 26 January 2008: Companion of the Order of Australia (General division) for contributions to Australia's defence industry through the provision of leadership and strategic advice on the development of naval capabilities, to maritime transport management, and to the people of South Australia.

Personal life
In 1975, Scarce married Elizabeth Anne Taylor while posted at HMAS Watson. They have two adult children, Kasha (born in 1978), who works as a social worker in Sydney; and Kingsley (born in 1980), who serves as a lieutenant commander in the Royal Australian Navy.

References

 

1952 births
Australian military personnel of the Vietnam War
Australian republicans
Companions of the Order of Australia
Governors of South Australia
Knights of Grace of the Order of St John
Chancellors of the University of Adelaide
Living people
People from Adelaide
Recipients of the Conspicuous Service Cross (Australia)
Royal Australian Navy admirals